Georgios Masadis (1944 – 5 June 2017) was a Greek former professional football (soccer) player who played for the Superleague club Veria his entire career from 1966 to 1981 and played in both Alpha Ethniki and Beta Ethniki championships. He was born in Kastoria.

Career
Masadis joined Veria in 1966. Although, he had several offers to join Olympiacos, Panathinaikos, AEK and PAOK, he never left Veria. He is considered as a club legend and he belongs to the long list of one-club men as he played in Veria for fifteen years. He made 368 appearances in both professional league levels of Alpha Ethniki (currently Superleague) and Beta Ethniki (currently Football League). He was also manager of Veria during 1984–85 season.

Personal life
After retiring from football in 1981, Masadis moved to Veria permanently. He was also married.

He died in June 2017, aged 72.

See also
List of one-club men in association football

References

1944 births
2017 deaths
Footballers from Kastoria
Greek footballers
Association football goalkeepers
Super League Greece players
Football League (Greece) players
Veria F.C. players
Veria F.C. managers
Greek football managers